Zarduiyeh (also Romanized as Zardū’īyeh; also known asZardūn) is a village in Dehaj Rural District, Dehaj District, Shahr-e Babak County, Kerman Province, Iran. At the 2006 census, its population was 422, in 84 families.

References 

Populated places in Shahr-e Babak County